HMS Amazon was a prototype design of destroyer ordered for the Royal Navy in 1924. She was designed and built by Thornycroft in response to an admiralty request for a new design of destroyer incorporating the lessons and technological advances of the First World War.

Design and construction
Two final designs were offered to the Admiralty, who required prototypes for subsequent destroyer construction. Thornycroft's "A" design used the maximum length allowed (310 ft between perpendiculars).

Two different designs for the machinery were prepared, plus a third outline design. The "B" design was modified in November 1924 after building had begun, to take machinery capable of giving an extra  speed; this required extra length. After the initial trials in 1926, the turbines were altered.

Amazon was easily recognisable by her slab-sided funnels, characteristic of Thornycroft vessels. Most differences were internal. Unlike earlier designs, which were designed for home fleet service, they were designed for colonial use, with higher freeboard, cruising turbines and better ventilation.

Armament was identical to that in the s built late during the First World War, and comprised four  BL Mark I on CP Mk.VI** mountings. These weapons were based on an Army field piece and had separate bagged charges and no Quick Firing (QF) mechanism. The mountings had half shields and a maximum elevation of 30°.

Fire control was by a  base rangefinder and the new "Destroyer Director Control Tower" (DCT). The latter would be fitted to all subsequent Royal Navy destroyer designs from the C class up to the U class of 1942. Amazon reached only  on her initial trials, and so was taken in hand for modifications. Her sea speed in load condition in service was only . She was completed on 5 May 1927.

Amazon was fitted out for service during the Second World War as a convoy escort. Her "A" and "Y" 4.7 in guns and after set of torpedo tubes were removed. A 12-pounder  Mk.V anti-aircraft gun was added in place of the torpedoes (to remedy the lack of a heavy anti-aircraft weapon), and a "Hedgehog" anti-submarine projector was added on the forecastle. Type 286P radar was added at the masthead, and the rangefinder and director on the bridge were replaced with a centimetric Type 271 for detecting surfaced submarines. The 2-pounder guns were replaced with  Oerlikon anti-aircraft cannons, with a further pair added in the bridge wings. In 1943, the 12-pounder gun and the remaining torpedo tubes were removed to allow a 10-round depth charge pattern to be carried, and Type 291 radar replaced her Type 286P.

Service history
She spent most of the war up to 1942 escorting North Atlantic and Russian convoys, moving to the Mediterranean and taking part in Operation Pedestal, until returning to home waters in 1943 for the duration of the war. By 1944 she was reduced to acting as a target and was broken up by West of Scotland Shipbreaking at Troon in 1949.

The ship was depicted on a Maltese postage stamp that was issued on 10 August 2012 commemorating the 70th anniversary of Operation Pedestal.

References

References

 
 
 
 
 
 
 
 
 

World War II destroyers of the United Kingdom
1926 ships
Ships built by John I. Thornycroft & Company